Sophia Historic District is a national historic district located at  Sophia, Raleigh County, West Virginia. It encompasses 22 contributing buildings located in the central business district of Sophia.  The consist primarily of one and two story masonry buildings with storefronts on the first floor and housing in the upper stories.  Notable buildings include the Filling Station (c. 1925), Reck's Place/The Chestnut Tree Café and Art Gallery (c. 1936), Attili Building (1939), Visionz Lounge (c. 1955), LB & J Antiques (1937), Ben Franklin / Federated Department Store (c. 1937), and Sophia Theater (c. 1925).

It was listed on the National Register of Historic Places in 2006.

References

National Register of Historic Places in Raleigh County, West Virginia
Historic districts on the National Register of Historic Places in West Virginia
Buildings and structures in Raleigh County, West Virginia
Buildings designated early commercial in the National Register of Historic Places in West Virginia
Historic districts in Raleigh County, West Virginia